In mechanical engineering, a bistable structure is one that has two stable mechanical shapes, particularly where they are stabilized by different curvature axes.

A common example of a bistable structure is a slap bracelet.

Bistable structures enable long tube-like structures to roll up into small cylinders.

References

Geometric shapes
Structural engineering